Bob Steele (born Robert Adrian Bradbury; January 23, 1907 – December 21, 1988) was an American actor. He also was billed as Bob Bradbury Jr..

Early life
Steele was born in Portland, Oregon, into a vaudeville family. His parents were Robert North Bradbury and the former Nieta Quinn. He had a twin brother, Bill, also an actor.

After years of touring, the family settled in Hollywood in the late 1910s, where his father soon found work in the movies, first as an actor, later as a director. By 1920, Robert Bradbury hired his son Bob and Bob's twin brother, Bill (1907–1971), as juvenile leads for a series of adventure movies titled The Adventures of Bill and Bob. Steele attended Glendale High School but left before graduation.

Career

Steele's career began to take off in 1927, when he was hired by production company Film Booking Offices of America (FBO) to star in a series of Westerns. Renamed Bob Steele at FBO, he soon made a name for himself, and in the late 1920s, 1930s and 1940s starred in B-Westerns for almost every minor film studio, including Monogram, Supreme, Tiffany, Syndicate, Republic (including several films of The Three Mesquiteers series) and Producers Releasing Corporation (PRC) (including the initial films of their "Billy the Kid" series), plus he had the occasional role in an A-movie, as in the adaptation of John Steinbeck's novel, Of Mice and Men in 1939.

In cowboy movies shown on TV in the 1940s he played a dashing, but short cowboy replete with eye-make-up and lipstick. In the 1940s, Steele's career as a cowboy hero was on the decline, although he still had leading roles in Westerns as late as 1946 in films such as Ambush Trail (1946). He kept himself working regularly by accepting supporting roles in big movies like Howard Hawks' The Big Sleep, or the John Wayne vehicles Island in the Sky, Rio Bravo , Rio Lobo, The Comancheros, and The Longest Day. Besides these he also made occasional appearances in science fiction films like Atomic Submarine and Giant from the Unknown. 

He also performed on television, including the role of Sergeant Granger in the premiere episode, "The Peacemaker", in 1957 of the ABC/Warner Brothers western series, Colt .45. In 1957, he was cast as Sam Shoulders in "Bunch Quitter" in another ABC/WB western series, Sugarfoot, with Will Hutchins. He appeared in 1958 and 1959 in two episodes of the NBC western, The Californians, as well as three episodes of Maverick with James Garner, including "The War of the Silver Kings," "The Seventh Hand," and "Holiday at Hollow Rock."

Steele appeared as "Kirby" with Agnes Moorehead and Madlyn Rhue in the 1959 episode "In Memoriam" of another ABC western series, The Rebel, starring Nick Adams. He also appeared as Deputy Sam in four episodes of Hugh O'Brian's The Life and Legend of Wyatt Earp. In 1959, he appeared with Mason Alan Dinehart, another Wyatt Earp alumnus, in the episode "Half a Loaf" of the syndicated series, Death Valley Days, hosted by Stanley Andrews.

Steele appeared in six different episodes of the Walt Disney's Western television series Texas John Slaughter with Tom Tryon.  On January 25, 1960, Steele was cast as the frontier gunfighter Luke Short in an episode of the CBS western series, The Texan, starring Rory Calhoun. Barbara Stuart played the gambler Poker Alice in the same episode, which also features Reed Hadley and Richard Devon.

In the mid-1960s, Steele was cast in a regular supporting role as Trooper Duffy in ABC's F Troop, which allowed him to show his comic talent. Trooper Duffy in the F Troop story line claimed to have been "shoulder to shoulder with Davy Crockett at the Alamo" and to have been the only survivor of the battle 40 years before. In real life, forty years before F Troop, Steele played a supporting role in his father's 1926 film Davy Crockett at the Fall of the Alamo.

Steele is interred in the columbarium at  Forest Lawn Memorial Park in the Hollywood Hills.

Legacy
Steele is said to have been the inspiration for the character "Cowboy Bob" in the Dennis The Menace comic strip.

Selected filmography

References

External links

 Bob Steele – A Biography on (re)Search my Trash
 
 

1907 births
1988 deaths
Male Western (genre) film actors
American male television actors
Male actors from Portland, Oregon
Male actors from Los Angeles
Deaths from emphysema
American male film actors
Singing cowboys
Burials at Forest Lawn Memorial Park (Hollywood Hills)
Fraternal twin male actors
American twins
20th-century American male actors
20th-century American singers
20th-century American male singers